Coxswain Patrick Colbert (1842 to January 19, 1877) was an Irish soldier who served in the United States Navy during the American Civil War. 

Colbert received the United States' highest award for bravery during combat, the Medal of Honor, for his action aboard the ferry  during the Capture of Plymouth on 31 October 1864. He was honored with the award on 31 December 1864.

Biography
Colbert was born in Ireland in 1842. He enlisted into the United States Navy. He died on 19 January 1877 and his remains are interred at the Mount Elliott Cemetery in Michigan.

Medal of Honor citation

See also

List of American Civil War Medal of Honor recipients: A–F

References

1842 births
1877 deaths
Irish-born Medal of Honor recipients
People of New York (state) in the American Civil War
Union Navy officers
United States Navy Medal of Honor recipients
American Civil War recipients of the Medal of Honor